SGB may refer to:

Organisations
 Schweizerischer Gewerkschaftsbund, the Swiss Trade Union Federation
 Scholengemeenschap Bonaire, the secondary school on the island of Bonaire
 SGB-SMIT Group, a transformer manufacturer
 St.George Bank (ASX code), an Australian bank
 Société Générale de Belgique, a Belgian bank

Entertainment and media
 Super Game Boy, a Super Nintendo Entertainment System accessory
 Russian Spetsnaz Guards Brigade, a faction in the Tom Clancy's EndWar video game and novelization

Other uses

 Sozialgesetzbuch, the German Code of social law
 Speedway Great Britain Premiership, the top division
 Speedway Great Britain Championship, the second division
 Supergalactic latitude (SGB), a measure of latitude in the astronomical supergalactic coordinate system
 Surabaya Gubeng railway station, Surabaya, East Java, Indonesia (station code: SGB)
 Steam gun boat, World War II Royal Navy vessels